Haemophilus pittmaniae is a Gram-negative species of bacterium of the family Pasteurellaceae. Strains of this species were originally isolated from humans. The species may be associated with respiratory infections in individuals with lung disease.

References

External links
Type strain of Haemophilus pittmaniae at BacDive -  the Bacterial Diversity Metadatabase

pittmaniae
Gram-negative bacteria
Bacteria described in 2005